Theodore Chickering Williams (July 2, 1855, Brookline, Massachusetts – May 6, 1915, Boston, Massachusetts) was an American Unitarian pastor and hymnwriter. 

He became the first headmaster of the Hackley School, in Tarrytown, New York, in 1899. He published English translations of the works of the Latin poets Tibullus and Virgil.

References

External links

 Biography at the Cyber Hymnal
 
 

Writers from Brookline, Massachusetts
American Unitarian clergy
American hymnwriters
1855 births
1915 deaths
19th-century American writers
Latin–English translators
19th-century translators
Translators of Virgil